Giannaioi is a community of the municipal unit of Falaisia in Arcadia, Peloponnese, Greece. It consists of the two mountain villages Ano Giannaioi (population 35 in 2011) and Kato Giannaioi (population 47 in 2011). Ano Giannaioi is 1 km southeast of Kato Giannaioi. Both villages are situated on a mountain slope, in the northern foothills of the Taygetus mountains, between 600 and 700 m elevation. Kato Giannaioi is 1 km south of Kamara, 5 km north of Dyrrachio, 11 km southeast of Leontari and 19 km south of Megalopoli.

Population

See also
List of settlements in Arcadia

References

External links
History and information about Giannaioi
Giannaioi on the GTP Travel Pages

Falaisia
Populated places in Arcadia, Peloponnese